Harold Mitchell may refer to:
Sir Harold Mitchell, 1st Baronet (1900–1983), British businessman and politician
Harold Mitchell (media buyer) (born 1942), Australian entrepreneur, media buyer, philanthropist and humanitarian
Harold Mitchell (Newfoundland politician) (1891–1952), member of the Newfoundland House of Assembly
Harold Mitchell Jr. (born 1965), member of the South Carolina House of Representatives
Harold Mitchell (A Streetcar Named Desire), a character in A Streetcar Named Desire
Harry Mitchell (boxer) (1898–1983), English boxer

See also
Harry Mitchell (disambiguation)